Joe McDonnell may refer to:

Joe McDonnell (hunger striker) (1951–1981), Provisional IRA hunger striker
Joe McDonnell (rugby union) (born 1973), New Zealand rugby union player
Joe McDonnell (ice hockey) (born 1961), Canadian ice hockey player
Joe McDonnell (footballer) (born 1994), English football player